Towne v. Eisner, 245 U.S. 418 (1918), is a United States Supreme Court case in which the Court held that "a stock dividend based on accumulated profits was not 'income' within the true intent of the statute." Congress passed a new law in reaction to Towne v. Eisner and so the case was soon overturned by the Supreme Court in Eisner v. Macomber.

It includes the quotable passage: “A word is not a crystal, transparent and unchanged; it is the skin of a living thought and may vary greatly in colour and content according to the circumstances and time in which it is used.” ― Oliver Wendell Holmes Jr.

References

External links
 

Overruled United States Supreme Court decisions
United States Supreme Court cases
United States Supreme Court cases of the White Court
United States Sixteenth Amendment case law
United States taxation and revenue case law
Dividends
1918 in United States case law